Majid Bagherinia (born 13 November 1959) is an Iranian football manager and the current head coach of Shahrdari Mahshahr.

Honors

As a manager
Shahin Ahvaz F.C.
Hazfi Cup:
''Winners (1): 1988

References

Living people
Iranian football managers
1959 births
People from Ahvaz
Sportspeople from Khuzestan province
Foolad F.C. managers